Tim Mikkelson (born 13 August 1986 in Matamata) is a New Zealand rugby union player.

Mikkelson plays for the New Zealand national rugby sevens team and is the most capped player in the team's history, surpassing former captain DJ Forbes record when he played his 90th tournament in Los Angeles in 2020. Mikkelson was then named player of the tournament for the 2013 Rugby Sevens World Cup and also received IRB Sevens Player of the Year for the 2012–13 season.

Mikkelson has scored more than 200 career tries for New Zealand in the World Rugby Sevens Series, putting him third on the all-time try scorers list in that competition.

Mikkelson has also played rugby for the Chiefs and for Waikato.

References

External links
 
 
 
 
 
 

1986 births
Living people
Chiefs (rugby union) players
Commonwealth Games gold medallists for New Zealand
Commonwealth Games medallists in rugby sevens
Commonwealth Games rugby sevens players of New Zealand
Commonwealth Games silver medallists for New Zealand
Medalists at the 2020 Summer Olympics
New Zealand international rugby sevens players
New Zealand male rugby sevens players
New Zealand rugby union players
Olympic medalists in rugby sevens
Olympic rugby sevens players of New Zealand
Olympic silver medalists for New Zealand
Rugby sevens players at the 2010 Commonwealth Games
Rugby sevens players at the 2014 Commonwealth Games
Rugby sevens players at the 2016 Summer Olympics
Rugby sevens players at the 2018 Commonwealth Games
Rugby sevens players at the 2020 Summer Olympics
Rugby union players from Matamata
Rugby union wings
Waikato rugby union players
Medallists at the 2010 Commonwealth Games
Medallists at the 2014 Commonwealth Games
Medallists at the 2018 Commonwealth Games